Samuel John William Scott (born 5 June 1990) is a former professional rugby league footballer who last played as a  for the Bradford Bulls in the Betfred Championship.

Scott has previously played for the Batley Bulldogs, Sheffield Eagles and York City Knights, in England, and has played cricket for Shelley in the Drakes league.

References

External links
York City Knights profile
Sheffield Eagles profile
York City Knights profile

1990 births
Living people
Batley Bulldogs players
Bradford Bulls players
English rugby league players
Rugby league players from Yorkshire
Rugby league second-rows
Sheffield Eagles players
York City Knights players